Ottokar is the medieval German form of the Germanic name Audovacar.

People with the name Ottokar include:
Two kings of Bohemia, members of the Přemyslid dynasty
 Ottokar I of Bohemia (–1230)
 Ottokar II of Bohemia (–1278)
Four Styrian margraves, members of the Otakar dynasty
 Ottokar I of Styria (died 1075)
 Ottokar II of Styria (died 1122)
 Ottokar III of Styria (died 1164)
 Ottokar IV, Duke of Styria (1163–1192)
 Ottokar Chiari (1853–1918), Austrian laryngologist
 Ottokar Czernin (1872–1932), Austro-Hungarian diplomat
 Ottokar Domma (1924–2007), German journalist and writer
 Ottokar Fischer (1873–1940), Austrian magician
 Ottokar Lorenz (1832–1904), Austrian-German historian and genealogist
 Ottokar Nováček (1866–1900), Austro-Hungarian violinist
 Ottokár Prohászka (1858–1927), Hungarian Roman Catholic theologian and bishop
 Ottokar Runze (born 1925), German film producer
 Ottokar Tumlirz (1856–1928), Austrian physicist
 Ottokar Weise, German Olympic sailor

Fictional characters
 King Ottokar IV of Syldavia, from the Tintin comic book King Ottokar's Sceptre
 The prince in Carl Maria von Weber's opera Der Freischütz

See also 
 Otakar

German given names
Czech masculine given names